Judge Bland may refer to:

Oscar E. Bland (1877–1951), judge of the United States Court of Customs and Patent Appeals
Theodorick Bland (judge) (1776–1846), judge of the United States District Court for the District of Maryland

See also
Justice Bland (disambiguation)